"Water on Glass" is the third single by British singer Kim Wilde from her self-titled album.

A slightly different version of the song was featured on Wilde's eponymous debut album. It was released in the UK, Ireland and The Netherlands only with the non-album track "Boys" on the B-side.
The song was also the first track by Kim Wilde to appear on a Billboard chart, reaching #53 on the Top 60 Rock Tracks on 15 May 1982.

The song is about tinnitus, a medical condition that causes ringing in the ears.

Critical reception
"Water on Glass" made a big impression on David Hepworth of Smash Hits. He could not determine which single from an album is the best. He wrote: "What's the best track on the album? This one? O.K., whack it out single-shaped. Ricky's deck is as full of well practised tricks as ever; shimmering synths slip 'n' slide round a knuckle full of beat while Kim's perfectly detached vocal drags the chorus in like a trouper."

Track listing 
A. "Water on Glass" – 3:36
B. "Boys" – 3:13

Charts

References

External links
"Water on Glass" lyrics

1981 singles
Kim Wilde songs
Songs written by Marty Wilde
Songs written by Ricky Wilde
1981 songs
RAK Records singles